Ciudad del Libertador General Don José de San Martín, more commonly known as San Martín, is the administrative seat of General San Martín Partido in the urban agglomeration of Greater Buenos Aires.

Geography
The area is heavily urbanised and is home to numerous food processing industries, as well as to a large Peugeot-Citroën auto factory. The city is bordered to the north-east by the autonomous city of Buenos Aires.

Sport
The town is home to Chacarita Juniors football club, champions of Argentina in Metropolitano 1969.

Famous residents
 José Hernández, writer.
 Marianela Núñez, ballet dancer
 Oscar Alfredo Gálvez, racing driver.
 Roberto De Vicenzo, golfer.
 Agustín Carlos Roberto García, musician.

Images

See also
 List of twin towns and sister cities in Argentina

References

External links

 San Martín website

 
Populated places established in 1864
Populated places in Buenos Aires Province
Cities in Argentina